is the fifth studio album by Japanese singer Yōko Oginome. Released through Victor Entertainment on December 16, 1986, the album features the hit singles "Dance Beat wa Yoake made" and "Roppongi Junjōha", plus remixes of "Dancing Hero (Eat You Up)" and "Flamingo in Paradise" and Japanese-language covers of Shocking Blue's "Venus", Paul Chiten's "Melting Point", and Finzy Kontini's "Cha-Cha-Cha". The album was reissued on March 24, 2010 with ten bonus karaoke tracks as part of Oginome's 25th anniversary celebration.

The album hit No. 1 on Oricon's albums chart and sold over 691,000 copies.

Track listing

Charts
Weekly charts

Year-end charts

References

External links
 
 
  

1986 albums
Yōko Oginome albums
Japanese-language albums
Victor Entertainment albums

ja:NON-STOPPER